Orlando Wirht (born 25 May 1981) is a Dutch former professional footballer who played as a centre-back.

Club career
Wirht played youth football for FC Twente and Go Ahead Eagles. He played one season in the Eerste Divisie for Stormvogels Telstar, making four appearances. As his contract was set to expire in June 2003, he trialled with Iraklis in May 2003 where compatriot Regillio Vrede already played. Earlier he had an unsuccessful trial with Danish Superliga club OB. After failing to find a new club, Wirht played for CSV Apeldoorn in the lower tiers.

International career
He is a Netherlands youth international, having gained two caps for the Netherlands U18 team.

References

External links
Voetbal International profile

1981 births
Living people
People from Emmeloord
Dutch footballers
Footballers from Noordoostpolder
SC Telstar players
Eerste Divisie players
Association football defenders
CSV Apeldoorn players
FC Twente players
Go Ahead Eagles players
Netherlands youth international footballers